The Escort is a 1993 Italian crime film directed by Ricky Tognazzi. It was an entry at the 1993 Cannes Film Festival.

Plot
Sicily, 1990s. Following the killing of the deputy prosecutor Rizzo and the carabinieri marshal Virzì, the magistrate Michele De Francesco arrives in Trapani. His escort consists of Angelo, native of the place, a friend of the slain marshal and determined to do justice; of Andrea, head of the Trapani escort; of Fabio, a Roman who does not accept the risky assignment, and the two drivers, Raffaele and Nicola. Soon the magistrate, investigating the water supply of the city and the construction of a large dam, discovers dangerous collusions between the mafia, politics and law enforcement, in the persons of the M.P. Nestore Bonura, the deputy prefect Scavone and the boss Mazzaria. The decision to close the wells that supply the city causes a scandal to which De Francesco decides to take shelter, giving the men of the escort powers and prerogatives that effectively deprive the staff of the Prosecutor's Office, of which the ambiguous Polizzi seems the probable mole. After initial disagreements between Angelo and Andrea, an increasingly intense friendship arises between the men in the escort, in the midst of a daily odyssey made up of exhausting telephone checks, risky car journeys, threats. The judge's daughter, who arrived in Trapani to celebrate her birthday with her father, miraculously escapes a bomb attack on the car in which she had to travel. Thus dies the driver Raffaele. The pursuit of the investigation also leads to the killing, by the Cosa Nostra, of Bonura, now gripped by overwhelming evidence, despite the silence of a colleague and friend of De Francesco, judge Barresi of Caltanissetta. Worthless is the anger of the escort men who, now in tune with the magistrate, decide, despite everything, to stay by his side, including Fabio who would even give up the long waited transfer. However, an order of the judiciary transfers the judge accusing him of having used the escort beyond his specific duties, of having disturbed public order and offended the prestige of the Prosecutor's staff. Forced by the events De Francesco embarks for the mainland greeted by the men of his escort who have never betrayed him.

Cast
 Claudio Amendola - Angelo Mandolesi
 Enrico Lo Verso - Andrea Corsale
 Carlo Cecchi - Assistant Prosecuting Magistrate Michele De Francesco
 Ricky Memphis - Fabio Muzzi
 Tony Sperandeo - Raffaele Frasca
 Lorenza Indovina - Lia Corsale
 Ugo Conti - Nicola
 Rita Savagnone - Angelo's Mother
 Giovanni Alamia - Nino Carabba
 Francesca D'Aloja - Anna Spano
 Giovanni Pallavicino - Padre Virzi
 Giacinto Ferro - M.P. Nestore Bonura
 Guia Jelo - Rosalia Carabba
 Benedetto Raneli - President Caruso
 Francesco Siciliano - Policeman Marchetti
 Angelo Infanti - Judging Magistrate Barresi

Reception
It spent two weeks at the top of the Italian box office grossing $1.3 million in its first week and $1.9 million after 10 days from 84 screens.

Year-end lists
 Honorable mention – David Elliott, The San Diego Union-Tribune

References

External links

1993 films
1993 crime drama films
Italian crime drama films
1990s Italian-language films
Films directed by Ricky Tognazzi
Films scored by Ennio Morricone
1990s Italian films